The Haroharo Caldera was a  postulated volcanic feature in Taupō Volcanic Zone of the North Island, New Zealand within the larger and older Ōkataina Caldera. Since 2010 further studies have tended to use the terms Haroharo vent alignment, Utu Caldera, Matahina Caldera, Rotoiti Caldera and a postulated Kawerau Caldera to the features assigned to it.

Geography
In the north the Haroharo Caldera extends from the eastern half of Lake Rotoiti to the western border of Lake Rotoma. Its southern extent is defined by the Tarawera volcano.

Geology

The Haroharo Caldera is within the older and larger Ōkataina Caldera. It is now not regarded as a caldera in its own right and there have been many attempts to rationalise the literature. There have been multiple significant eruptions from the Haroharo vent line that is parallel and to the north of the Mount Tarawera vent line also within the Ōkataina Caldera. There has been a large amount of dome infilling that refer to the name but the Ōkataina complex volcano appears to have emerged as a better term than the Haroharo volcano to understand the processes that have happened in this portion of the Taupō Volcanic Zone. Both the Okareka Embayment and the Tarawera Volcanic Complex are adjacent to the Haroharo Caldera which older maps had overlapping the Okataina caldera as part of the Ōkataina volcanic centre and sometimes defined as the Haroharo volcanic complex.

References

Taupō Volcanic Zone
Calderas of New Zealand
Rift volcanoes
Okataina Volcanic Centre
VEI-5 volcanoes
Holocene calderas